Logan's Run is a 1967 novel.

Logan's Run may also refer to:
Logan's Run (film), a 1976 science fiction film
Logan's Run (TV series), a science fiction television series
"Logan's Run" (song), a song by Babyland

See also
Logan Run, a tributary of the Susquehanna River